Arafura is an electoral division of the Legislative Assembly in Australia's Northern Territory. It was first created in 1983, and takes its name from the Arafura Sea, which adjoins the electorate. The electorate is predominantly rural, encompassing  in western Arnhem Land and the Tiwi Islands, and including the towns of Gunbalanya, Jabiru, Maningrida, Milikapiti and Nguiu. There were 5,183 people enrolled in the electorate as of August 2020.

Background
Arafura was a safe seat for the Labor Party for most of its history. Its first MLA was Labor leader Bob Collins, who transferred to the seat from Arnhem upon the expansion of the Assembly in 1983. Collins retired 4 years later and was replaced by Stan Tipiloura. Tipiloura died of kidney failure in 1992, and was succeeded by former Australian rules footballer Maurice Rioli. Rioli retired at the 2001 election and was in turn succeeded by Marion Scrymgour. Scrymgour briefly left the Labor party in 2009 after being sacked as a minister, and retired at the 2012 election.

At that election, the CLP picked up a large and unprecedented swing in remote seats, which had traditionally been safe for Labor. Arafura was no exception, with CLP candidate Francis Xavier Kurrupuwu winning the seat on a 15 per cent swing. Kurrupuwu briefly left his party along with two other Indigenous CLP MLAs in 2014. Lawrence Costa regained the seat for Labor in 2016 as part of his party's landslide victory that year. The electorate has a particularly high Indigenous population, which has been reflected in its having been represented by five consecutive Indigenous MPs.

Members for Arafura

Election results

References

External links
 Division profile from the Northern Territory Electoral Commission

Arafura